Flaviopolis may refer to:
 Flaviopolis (Bithynia), a town of ancient Bithynia
 Flaviopolis (Cilicia), a town of ancient Cilicia
 Flaviopolis (Lydia), a town of ancient Lydia

See also
 Colonia Flaviopolis
 Flaviocaesareia